The Traverse City North Stars were a Tier II Junior A ice hockey team in the North American Hockey League's North Division, and played out of 1,500-seat Centre ICE Arena in Traverse City, Michigan. The franchise was purchased by the Soo Eagles, formerly of the Northern Ontario Junior Hockey League, after the 2011–12 season.

Regular season records

Playoff records

External links 
Official site

Defunct North American Hockey League teams
Sports in Traverse City, Michigan
Amateur ice hockey teams in Michigan
Ice hockey clubs established in 2005
Ice hockey clubs disestablished in 2012
2005 establishments in Michigan
2012 disestablishments in Michigan